Oriole is an unincorporated community in eastern Cape Girardeau County, in the U.S. state of Missouri.

The community is at the intersection of routes V and Y approximately eight miles northeast of Jackson. The Trail of Tears State Park is three miles to the east on Route V.

History
A post office called Oriole was established in 1879, and remained in operation until 1905. The origin of the name Oriole is obscure.

References

Unincorporated communities in Cape Girardeau County, Missouri
Unincorporated communities in Missouri